César Augusto Ruiz Sánchez (born 10 January 1990 in Lima, Peru) is a Peruvian footballer who most recently played for Deportivo Llacuabamba.

Profile
Coming from the popular district of Puente Piedra, César Ruiz joined Sporting Cristal in 1999.
In 2007 César Ruiz, along with 8 other U-20 players, were called up to the first team. For 2009, he was on loan at Coronel Bolognesi.

He was also part of the Peru U-17 team that reached the quarterfinal stage at the 2007 FIFA U-17 World Cup played in South Korea.

After playing Copa Peru with Coronel Bolognesi when they were relegated from the first division, he played for Hijos de Acosvinchos. This year signed a contract with Sport Boys.

References

External links

1990 births
Living people
Footballers from Lima
Association football midfielders
Peruvian footballers
Sporting Cristal footballers
Coronel Bolognesi footballers
Sport Boys footballers
León de Huánuco footballers
Sport Huancayo footballers
Unión Comercio footballers
Peruvian Primera División players
Peruvian Segunda División players